"Swords of a Thousand Men" is a song and single written by Eddie Tenpole, and performed by the English punk band Tenpole Tudor. It was first released on Stiff Records in March 1981. It entered the UK Singles Chart in April that year, reaching number 6 and staying for 10 weeks on the chart. On 1 June 1981, the single was awarded a silver certification by the BPI in the UK for sales of over 250,000 units.

Charts

Skyclad version

In 2001, British folk metal group Skyclad released the song as their second true single (after 1993's "Thinking Allowed"). It featured two versions of Skyclad's cover of the song, one with Tenpole Tudor, plus a re-recorded version of one of their earliest tracks.

In other media
The lyric "Over the hill with the swords of a thousand men" was used by writer Garth Ennis as the title for a story arc of his comic series The Boys, consisting of issues 60–65. This lyric was again used as the title for episode 3 of season 2 of the Amazon Prime Video adaptation of the comic.

The song enjoyed a new lease of life thanks to being used as the opening titles theme for 2012's The Pirates! In an Adventure with Scientists!. This led to it being picked up for a number of adverts, most recently in the British television advertisement for the holiday company Haven in 2020.

References

External links
Tenpole Tudor's video of the song

1981 songs
1981 singles
2001 singles
Tenpole Tudor songs
Skyclad (band) songs
Stiff Records singles
Songs written by Edward Tudor-Pole